The Tony Award for Best Performance by a Leading Actor in a Play is an honor presented at the Tony Awards, a ceremony established in 1947 as the Antoinette Perry Awards for Excellence in Theatre, to actors for quality leading roles in a Broadway play. The awards are named after Antoinette Perry, an American actress who died in 1946. Honors in several categories are presented at the ceremony annually by the Tony Award Productions, a joint venture of The Broadway League and the American Theatre Wing, to "honor the best performances and stage productions of the previous year." Despite the award first being presented in 1947, there were no nominees announced until 1956.

Winners and nominees

1940s

1950s

1960s

1970s

1980s

[[File:Derek Jacobi 2013.jpg|thumb|120px|Derek Jacobi won for Much Ado About Nothing (1985)]]

1990s

2000s

2010s

2020s

Multiple wins

 2 Wins
 Alan Bates
 Bryan Cranston
 Brian Dennehy
 José Ferrer
 Judd Hirsch
 James Earl Jones
 Frank Langella
 Fredric March
 Mark Rylance

Multiple nominations

 7 Nominations
 Brian Bedford
 Jason Robards

 6 Nominations
 Christopher Plummer

 5 Nominations
 Frank Langella

 4 Nominations
 Philip Bosco
 Hume Cronyn 
 James Earl Jones
 Donald Pleasence 
 Mark Rylance
 George C. Scott

 3 Nominations
 Jeff Daniels
 Ben Gazzara 
 Judd Hirsch
 John Lithgow
 Fredric March
 Alec McCowen
 Brían F. O'Byrne
 Ralph Richardson

 2 Nominations
 Alan Bates
 Richard Burton
 Gabriel Byrne
 Tom Courtenay
 Bryan Cranston
 Billy Crudup
 Jim Dale
 Brian Dennehy
 José Ferrer
 Ralph Fiennes
 Albert Finney
 Henry Fonda
 John Gielgud
 Rex Harrison
 Philip Seymour Hoffman
 Wilfrid Hyde-White
 Bill Irwin
 Derek Jacobi
 Kevin Kline
 Alfred Lunt
 Jack Lemmon
 Jefferson Mays
 Ian McKellen
 Alfred Molina
 Zero Mostel
 Liam Neeson
 Milo O'Shea
 Al Pacino
 Roger Rees
 Alan Rickman
 Cyril Ritchard
 Liev Schreiber
 Tom Sturridge
 Denzel Washington
 Nicol Williamson
 John Wood

Multiple character wins
 3 Wins
 George from Who's Afraid of Virginia Woolf? 2 Wins
 Henry from The Real Thing James Tyrone Sr. from Long Day's Journey into Night Prior Walter from Angels in America Troy Maxson from FencesMultiple character nominations

 4 Nominations
 Eddie Carbone from A View from the Bridge George from Who's Afraid of Virginia Woolf? James Tyrone Sr. from Long Day's Journey into Night 3 Nominations
 Bri from A Day in the Death of Joe Egg Hamlet from Hamlet Henry Drummond from Inherit the Wind John Merrick from The Elephant Man Willy Loman from Death of a Salesman 2 Nominations
 Antonio Salieri from Amadeus Charlie Fox from Speed-the-Plow Henry from The Real Thing Henry Carr from Travesties James Tyrone Jr. from A Moon for the Misbegotten Le Vicomte de Valmont from Les Liaisons Dangereuses Paul from Six Degrees of Separation President Ari Hockstader from The Best Man Prior Walter from Angels in America Shylock from The Merchant of Venice Theodore "Hickey" Hickman from The Iceman Cometh Tobias from A Delicate Balance Tom Sergeant from Skylight Troy Maxson from FencesProductions with multiple nominationsLook Homeward, Angel -- Alizwa Mleni and Anthony PerkinsThe Best Man -- Melvyn Douglas (winner) and Lee TracyPhiladelphia, Here I Come! -- Patrick Bedford and Donal Donnelly (jointly)Home -- John Gielgud and Ralph RichardsonUncle Vanya -- George C. Scott and Nicol WilliamsonSizwe Banzi is Dead and The Island -- John Kani and Winston Ntshona (joint winners)Amadeus -- Ian McKellen (winner) and Tim CurryLend Me A Tenor -- Philip Bosco (winner) and Victor GarberTrue West -- Philip Seymour Hoffman and John C. ReillyStones In His Pockets -- Sean Campion and Conleth HillGod of Carnage -- Jeff Daniels and James GandolfiniSea Wall/A Life -- Jake Gyllenhaal and Tom SturridgeThe Lehman Trilogy -- Simon Russell Beale (winner), Adam Godley and Adrian Lester

Multiple awards and nominations
Actors who have been nominated multiple times in any acting categories

Trivia

 The lead role of George in Edward Albee's Who's Afraid of Virginia Woolf? has earned the Tony Award for three different actors who have performed the character:
 1963 – Arthur Hill
 2005 – Bill Irwin
 2013 – Tracy Letts
 Other male roles have produced multiple Tony Award winners: Henry in Tom Stoppard's The Real Thing 1984 – Jeremy Irons
 2000 – Stephen Dillane
 James Tyrone Sr., in Eugene O'Neill's Long Day's Journey into Night 1957 – Fredric March
 2003 – Brian Dennehy
 Troy Maxson in August Wilson's Fences 1987 – James Earl Jones
 2010 – Denzel Washington
 Prior Walter in Tony Kushner's Angels in America 1994 – Stephen Spinella
 2018 – Andrew Garfield
 Spinella won this category in 1994 for playing Prior Walter in Angels in America: Perestroika one year after winning the award for Best Featured Actor in a Play for the same character in Angels in America: Millennium Approaches.
 Actors have won Tony Awards for both Best Actor in a Play and Best Actor in a Musical for playing Cyrano de Bergerac: Jose Ferrer in Cyrano de Bergerac and Christopher Plummer in Cyrano.
 Donald Moffat was nominated for his performances in two different productions--Right You Are (If You Think You Are) and The Wild Duck''—at the 21st Tony Awards.
 The youngest winner in this acting category is Alex Sharp (age 26). The oldest is Frank Langella (age 78).

References

External links
Official Tony Awards website

Tony Awards
Theatre acting awards
Awards established in 1947
1947 establishments in the United States